is both a masculine Japanese given name and a Japanese surname.

Possible writings
克也, "gram, to be"
勝也, "win, to be"
勝矢, "win, arrow"
勝哉, "win, how"
勝夜, "win, night"
活耶, "active, father"
活弥, "active, extensive, complete"
轄也, "administer, control, to be"
担耶, "carry, bear, father"

People with the given name
, Japanese mathematician
, Japanese video game designer
, Japanese footballer
, Japanese baseball player
, Japanese wrestler
, Japanese actor
, Japanese sociologist
, Japanese manga artist, character designer, animator and animation director
, Japanese football player
, Japanese film director and screenwriter
, Japanese karateka
, Japanese football player
, Japanese freestyle skier
, Japanese footballer
, Japanese baseball player
, Japanese politician
, Japanese politician
, Japanese boxer
, Japanese voice actor
, Japanese cyclist
, Japanese footballer
, Japanese snowboarder
, Japanese plastic surgeon
, Japanese illustrator
, Japanese mixed martial artist
, Japanese sprint canoeist
, Japanese musician

People with the surname
, Japanese actor
, Japanese writer
, Japanese journalist
, Japanese footballer

Fictional characters
Katsuya Jounouchi (城之内 克也), a character from Yu-Gi-Oh!

Japanese-language surnames
Japanese masculine given names